Kretschmer's longbill (Macrosphenus kretschmeri) is a species of Old World warbler in the family Macrosphenidae.
It is found in Kenya, Mozambique, and Tanzania.
Its natural habitats are subtropical or tropical moist lowland forests and subtropical or tropical moist montane forests.

References

Kretschmer's longbill
Birds of East Africa
Kretschmer's longbill
Taxa named by Oscar Neumann
Taxonomy articles created by Polbot